The Very Best of Baccara is a compilation album by Spanish duo Baccara released by Sony BMG in June 2006.

This 14 track compilation was issued by Sony-BMG (formerly BMG-Ariola) and while it includes recordings by the original formation of the duo, Mayte Mateos and Maria Mendiola, is digitally remastered and offers one rarity in the form of the Spanish-language version of "The Devil Sent You Lorado" it omits many of the duo's hits and best known songs such as "Darling", "Number One", "Granada", "Cara Mia", "Koochie-Koo", "Can't Help Falling In Love", "Feel Me", "Baby Why Don't You Reach Out/Light My Fire", "Somewhere In Paradise" and "By 1999", most of which were included on the 18 track UK edition The Best of Baccara issued the year before. The international version replaces many of these with selections from their final album Bad Boys and only contains two tracks from their best-selling debut Baccara.

Track listing

 "Yes Sir, I Can Boogie"  (Dostal - Soja)  - 4:35
 "Sorry, I'm a Lady"  (Dostal - Soja)  - 3:39
 "The Devil Sent You To Lorado"  (Dostal - Soja)  - 4:03
 "Colorado" (Sacher) - 3:33
 "Body-Talk" (Soja - Dostal) - 4:30
 "Heart, Body And Soul" (Sacher) - 4:11
 "Woman To Woman" (Sacher) - 3:30
 "Ay, Ay Sailor"  (Dostal - Soja)  - 3:50
 "Parlez-Vous Français?" (English version) (Dostal - Soja - Zentner)  - 4:30
 "Adelita" (Traditional) - 2:27
 "Yummy, Yummy, Yummy"  (Levine - Resnick)  - 3:35
 "My Kisses Need A Cavalier" (Dostal - Soja) - 4:53
 "Ohio" (Sacher) - 3:05
 "El Diablo Te Mandó A Laredo" (Spanish version of "The Devil Sent You To Lorado") (Soja - Dostal) - 4:03

Personnel
 Mayte Mateos - vocals
 María Mendiola - vocals

Production
 Produced and arranged by Rolf Soja.
 Tracks 4, 6, 7 & 13 arranged by Bruce Baxter and produced by Graham Sacher.

Track annotations
 Tracks 1 & 2 from 1977 studio album Baccara.
 Track 3 from 1978 compilation The Hits Of Baccara.
 Tracks 4, 6, 7 & 13 from 1981 studio album Bad Boys.
 Tracks 5 & 8 from 1979 studio album Colours.
 Track 9 from 1978 7" single "Parlez-Vous Français? (English version)". Original French version appears on album Light My Fire.
 Tracks 10, 11 & 12 from 1978 studio album Light My Fire.
 Track 14 from 1978 7" single "El Diablo Te Mandó A Laredo" (Spain).

Baccara albums
2006 greatest hits albums